The 1988–89 Israel State Cup (Gvia HaMedina) was the 50th season of Israel's nationwide football cup competition and the 35th after the Israeli Declaration of Independence.

The competition was won by Beitar Jerusalem who have beaten Maccabi Haifa 4–3 on penalties after 3–3 in the final.

Format Changes
Starting with this edition, the ties, not including the semi-finals and the final, are to be played as two-legged ties.

Results

Round of 16

|}

Quarter-finals

|}

Semi-finals

Final

References
100 Years of Football 1906–2006, Elisha Shohat (Israel), 2006, pp. 277–8

Israel State Cup
State Cup
Israel State Cup seasons